Anjuman-e-Ittehad-e-Balochan-wa-Balochistan (English: Society for the Unity of Balochis and Balochistan) was a political party formed in 1931 in Mastung, Pakistan by Abdul Aziz Kurd and Yousaf Aziz Magsi. The Kalat State National Party emerged from AIB on 5 February 1937 in Sibi, contesting elections until the government banned its activities in 1947. The Anjuman-i-Watan Baluchistan, which allied itself with the Indian National Congress and opposed the partition of India, worked with the Anjuman-e-Ittehad-e-Balochan-wa-Balochistan, as well as its successor.

References

Bibliography
 
 
 
 

Khanate of Kalat
Defunct political parties in Pakistan
Political parties established in 1931

1931 establishments in India

Political parties disestablished in 1947
1947 disestablishments in British India